This is a list of lists of notable buildings and structures in Puerto Rico.

Lists include:
List of airports in Puerto Rico
List of bridges in Puerto Rico
List of bridges on the National Register of Historic Places in Puerto Rico
List of bridges documented by the Historic American Engineering Record in Puerto Rico
List of Carnegie libraries in Puerto Rico
List of casinos in Puerto Rico
List of castles in Puerto Rico
Churches
List of Catholic churches in Puerto Rico
List of Anglo-Catholic churches in Puerto Rico (Episcopal churches)
List of Methodist churches in Puerto Rico
List of convention centers in Puerto Rico
List of dams and reservoirs in Puerto Rico
List of fire stations in Puerto Rico
List of hospitals in Puerto Rico
List of hotels in Puerto Rico
Lighthouses in Puerto Rico
List of Masonic buildings in Puerto Rico
List of museums in Puerto Rico
List of prisons in Puerto Rico
Schools
List of high schools in Puerto Rico
List of sugar refineries in Puerto Rico
List of theaters in Ponce, Puerto Rico

See also